Chestnut Grove is an unincorporated community in Perry County, Tennessee, United States.  Its elevation is 600 feet (183 m).

References

Unincorporated communities in Perry County, Tennessee
Unincorporated communities in Tennessee